Gennaro Di Mauro (born 8 November 2001) is an Italian rower. He competed in the 2020 Summer Olympics, in Single sculls, finishing 8th.

Career 
In 2017, he participated in the junior world championships, finishing fifth.

In 2018, he participated at the European junior championships, at the junior world championships. At the Italian indoor rowing championships he set the new Italian junior record on the 2000 m rowing.

In 2019, he finished fourth at the Junior World Championships

References

2001 births
Living people
Rowers at the 2020 Summer Olympics
Italian male rowers
Olympic rowers of Italy
Sportspeople from the Province of Naples